Benešov is a town in the Central Bohemian Region and the capital of Benešov District, Czech Republic.

Benešov may also refer to places in the Czech Republic:

Benešov (Blansko District), a municipality and village in the South Moravian Region
Benešov nad Černou, a municipality and village in the South Bohemian Region
Benešov nad Ploučnicí, a town in the Ústí nad Labem Region
Benešov u Semil, a municipality and village in the Liberec Region
Dolní Benešov, a town in the Moravian-Silesian Region
Horní Benešov, a town in the Moravian-Silesian Region, until 1926 named just Benešov